Gábor Szilágyi (born 4 September 1981) is a Hungarian footballer who played for BVSC Budapest as striker.

References
 Futballévkönyv 1999 [Football Yearbook 1999], Volume I, pp. 78–82., Aréna 2000 kiadó, Budapest, 2000 

1981 births
Living people
Hungarian footballers
Hungary youth international footballers
Hungarian expatriate footballers
Association football forwards
Budapesti VSC footballers
FC Jokerit players
Helsingin Jalkapalloklubi players
FC KooTeePee players
Veikkausliiga players
Expatriate footballers in Finland
Hungarian expatriate sportspeople in Finland
Sportspeople from Eger